Less eligibility was a British government policy passed into law in the Poor Law Amendment Act 1834. It stated that conditions in workhouses had to be worse than conditions available outside so that there was a deterrence to claiming poor relief. In reality this meant that an individual had to be destitute in order to qualify for poor relief.

Rationale
The developers of less eligibility were convinced that their actions were utilitarian in principle. They had no problem with the aged and genuinely infirm who could not work under any circumstances (in reality, a fairly limited number). Instead, they thought the problem was the larger numbers of the able-bodied who either could not or would not earn enough money to support themselves. It was perceived that paying money to this category would increase their number.

Limitations
Less eligibility did not apply to children, who were considered blameless for their poverty.

Criticism
Bloy states that the separation of husbands and wives was the subject of "great hostility".

References

External links
Victorian web.org - The Principle of 'less eligibility' 

Poor Law in Britain and Ireland